Great Bačka Canal (Serbian: /) is a canal in Serbia which runs from Bezdan (on the Danube) to Bečej (on the Tisa). The excavation  works of Great Bačka Canal began in 1794 and went on until 1801 in Bács-Bodrog County, Kingdom of Hungary. The water of the canal is very polluted because it runs through industrial towns, such as Vrbas, Kula and Crvenka.

The canal not only is too small for navigation, but is also dangerous to bathe in due to the long-lasting pollution problem. The ministry of protection of environment of Serbia included it in the list of the country's "three black points". The pollution of the canal began in the second half of the 20th century. According to a number of researchers, the canal is considered one of the most polluted reservoirs in Europe and poses a threat to human health among the people living in nearby settlements. At the bottom of the canal there is up to 400,000 tons of silt which contains heavy metals and oil waste which also reach the rivers connected by the channel: the Danube and the Tisa. In 2008 the minister of environmental protection signed the Memorandum of canal cleaning.

See also
Little Bačka Canal
Danube-Tisa-Danube Canal

Notes

External links

Geography of Vojvodina
Canals in Serbia
Bačka
Canals opened in 1801
1801 establishments in Europe